Mamadou Papys Baldé (born 12 December 1985) is a former footballer who played as a defender. He has played for French club Langon-Castets.

Career
In October 2006, he left Legia Warszawa and came back to Senegal for some personal reason and he didn't come back for a long time. His first appearance after the break took place on 28 November 2006 in the friendly game against Zagłębie Sosnowiec.

International career
In 2010, Mamadou accepted to be naturalized Equatoguinean by the Equatoguinean Football Federation and played for Equatorial Guinea a friendly match against Botswana on 12 October.

References

External links

1985 births
Living people
People from Kolda Region
Senegalese footballers
Association football central defenders
Association football midfielders
FC Girondins de Bordeaux players
Legia Warsaw players
Clermont Foot players
Senegalese expatriate footballers
Senegalese expatriate sportspeople in France
Expatriate footballers in France
Senegalese expatriate sportspeople in Poland
Expatriate footballers in Poland
Naturalized citizens of Equatorial Guinea
Equatoguinean footballers
Equatorial Guinea international footballers
Equatoguinean people of Senegalese descent